Welcome Pass is a snow pass between Cairn Ridge and Czamanske Ridge, providing access to Tranquillity Valley in the Dufek Massif, Pensacola Mountains. Named from association with Tranquillity Valley; also because during the 1976–77 season, Arthur B. Ford and Willis H. Nelson, of United States Geological Survey (USGS), on discovery of a Soviet Antarctic Expedition helicopter cache left here the previous summer, left a note of welcome to the Dufek Massif for the Soviet Antarctic Expedition party leader, Garrik Grikurov.

Mountain passes of Antarctica
Landforms of Queen Elizabeth Land
Pensacola Mountains